Edit may refer to:

Concepts 
 an action that is part of an editing process (including of images, video, and film)
 a particular version that is the result of editing, especially of film (for example, fan edit), or music (for example, radio edit)
 a film transition, also known as a "cut"
 a change to a computer file
 a change in the genome introduced via gene editing, or in the epigenome via epigenome editing
 edit., an abbreviation of "edition"

Music
 edIT, American electronic DJ and producer
 Edit (album), a 2008 album by Mark Stewart
 "Edit", a song by Regina Spektor from the 2006 album Begin to Hope

Other uses
 Edit (given name), a list of people and fictional characters
 Equitas Development Initiatives Trust (EDIT), established by the Equitas Small Finance Bank in India
 Edit (application), a simple text editor for the Apple Macintosh
 Edit (MS-DOS), the MS-DOS Editor, a plain-text editor for MS-DOS, included in some versions of Microsoft Windows
 The Edit (film), a 1985 short film
 The Edit, a fashion magazine published by Net-a-Porter

See also
 
 
 Edith, a personal name
 Edict, a decree